David James Castle (born 25 May 1972) is a former cricket player who represented the Tasmanian Tigers in one first-class match.
He played as a right-arm off spin bowler. After solid performances as a junior player, Castle joined the Commonwealth Bank Cricket Academy in 1990 and 1991. Following his time at the academy, Castle returned to the Tasmanian Grade Cricket competition, where he impressed state selectors enough to earn a call up as a replacement spin bowler for a first-class practice match. He didn't bat in the match, and took match bowling figures of 3/105 at 37.00. Although he had not bowled badly, he was not selected to play for his state again.

References

External links

1972 births
Living people
Australian cricketers
Tasmania cricketers
Cricketers from Launceston, Tasmania